Leonid Ivanovich Sedov (14 November 1907 – 5 September 1999) was a leading Soviet expert on hydro- and aerodynamics and applied mechanics.

In 1930 Sedov graduated from the Moscow State University, where he had been a student of Sergey Chaplygin, with the degree of Doctor of Physics and Mathematical Sciences. He later became a professor at the university.

During World War II, he devised the so-called Sedov Similarity Solution for a blast wave. He was the first chairman of the USSR Space Exploration program and broke first news of its existence in 1955. He was president of the International Astronautical Federation (IAF) from 1959 to 1961. Until recently, it had been thought that Sedov was the principal engineer behind the Soviet Sputnik project.

Awards
1981 - Allan D. Emil Memorial Award

See also
Taylor–von Neumann–Sedov blast wave

References

Bibliography 
Reference to 1955 announcement
Obituary notice in Minutes of General Assembly Meetings, 2000 section
Sedov, L. I., 1959, Similarity and Dimensional Methods in Mechanics, 4th edn. Academic.
 L.I. Sedov, A course in continuum mechanics. Volumes. I-IV. Wolters-Noordhoff Publishing, Netherlands, 1971.
Sedov, L. I., "Propagation of strong shock waves," Journal of Applied Mathematics and Mechanics, Vol. 10, pages 241–250 (1946). (See also: Barber–Layden–Power effect)
Reference to confusion with Ukrainian physicist Sergei Korolyov .

1907 births
1999 deaths
Soviet physicists
Academic staff of the Moscow Institute of Physics and Technology
Full Members of the Russian Academy of Sciences
Members of the French Academy of Sciences
Heroes of Socialist Labour
Recipients of the Order of Lenin
Stalin Prize winners
Soviet  inventors
Commandeurs of the Légion d'honneur
Soviet space program personnel
Burials in Troyekurovskoye Cemetery
Baranov Central Institute of Aviation Motors employees
Foreign members of the Serbian Academy of Sciences and Arts